Povegliano is a comune (municipality) in the Province of Treviso in the Italian region Veneto, located about  north of Venice and about  northwest of Treviso.

Povegliano borders the following municipalities: Arcade, Giavera del Montello, Ponzano Veneto, Villorba, Volpago del Montello.

References

External links
 Official website

Cities and towns in Veneto